Shuitou Town (水头镇) could refer to the following towns:

Shuitou, Nan'an, Fujian, in Nan'an City
Shuitou, Fogang County, in Fogang County, Guangdong
Shuitou, Jiaokou County, Shanxi
Shuitou, Xia County, in Xia County, Shanxi
Shuitou, Pingyang County, in Pingyang County, Zhejiang

Other places
 Shuitou Village in Kinmen Island, Fujian, R.O.C.
 Shuitou Pier, in Shuitou Village, the main passenger sea port of Kinmen Island